Atlantida: mensário artístico, literário e social para Portugal e Brasil (Portuguese for "Atlantis")  was a review published in Portugal and Brazil from 1915 to 1920. The magazine was headed by João de Barros and João do Rio, with a perspective that created an organ of a straight reciprocal proximity between the two countries. These proximities between "sister nations" occupies a central theme of a review during the First World War, here it understood with an "adequate moment" for creating ties with the two states, based on race, traditional and common history, and the notion of "latinity", and also, with Portuguese and Brazilian cultures, that it added more forms of expression.

With the connection of this project were the names of Augusto Casimiro, Guerra Junqueiro, Jaime Cortesão, José de Campos Pereira, José de Macedo e Teófilo Braga that concerns the conflict between 1914 and 1918; Agostinho de Campos, António Carneiro Leão, Barbosa de Magalhães, Delfim Santos, João de Barros, João de Deus Ramos, Leonardo Coimbra and Lúcio dos Santos under education and teaching; José de Figueiredo and Aquilino Ribeiro in critical arts; Avelino de Almeida in theater; Joaquim Manso and Júlio Brandão in literature; Humberto Avelar in musical.  Other names were Camilo Pessanha, Delfim Guimarães, Fausto Guedes Teixeira, Afonso Lopes Vieira and Henrique de Vasconcelos. With the director of the Paris correspondent by Graça Aranha, it announced the contributions with Camille Mauclair, Edmond Jaloux, Gaston Riou and François de Miomande.

With the respect to its plastic arts, Atlantida reprinted for its square pages and styles by Alberto de Sousa, Almada Negreiros, António Carneiro, António Soares, Columbano Bordalo Pinheiro, João Vaz, José Malhoa, Mário Navarro da Costa, Raul Lino, Soares dos reis and Veloso Salgado.  It also highlighted its other contributions by Gabriele d'Annunzio, Guilherme Ferrero and Salomon Reinach.

References

External links
Atlantida : mensário artístico literário e social para Portugal e Brazil (1915-1920), digital copy at  Digital 

1915 establishments in Portugal
1915 establishments in Brazil
1920 disestablishments in Portugal
1920 disestablishments in Brazil
Cultural magazines
Defunct magazines published in Brazil
Defunct magazines published in Portugal
Magazines established in 1915
Magazines disestablished in 1920
Portuguese-language magazines